Cornwall & Devon Media is the Westcountry division of Reach.

In 2012, Local World acquired Cornwall & Devon Media owner Northcliffe Media from Daily Mail and General Trust. In October 2015, Trinity Mirror (Now Reach plc) reached agreement with Local World's other shareholders to buy the company.

Publications

Cornish Guardian,
The Cornishman,
Exeter & Express Echo,
Mid Devon Gazette Series,
North Devon Journal,
Plymouth Evening Herald,
The West Briton, Cornwall Today magazine,magazine and the Torquay Herald Express.

References

Northcliffe Media
Mass media in Devon
Mass media in Cornwall